Nejanalini Lake is a lake in northern Manitoba, near the provincial border with Nunavut, Canada.

Lakes of Manitoba